Gunter Thiebaut (born 12 January 1977) is a Belgian retired footballer who played as a striker.

Club career

Early career 
Thiebaut's professional career started at Lebbeke. Thiebaut was then signed by Eendracht Aalst in Summer 1998, a team that played in the First Division. After showing some great displays, he moved to Cypriot team Omonia Nicosia, and returned to Belgium after that.

In Belgium he played for Dender, which was known as FC Denderleeuw at that time. Here, he showed his goalscoring capabilities. In the 2002–2003 season at Denderleeuw, Thiebaut was top-scorer in the Belgian Second Division.

New adventure & topscorer
His great scoring earned him another adventure. In Germany he was signed by 1. FC Saarbrücken. He played some good seasons, but decided to find his way back to Belgium in 2005. S.V. Zulte Waregem was his new team in the 2006–2007 season. Thiebaut also became top scorer with 21 goals this season, the same number of goals as Gabriel Persa who played for Dessel Sport and Fraizer Campbell playing for Royal Antwerp on loan from Manchester United.

MVV
After that, he moved to Dender and finally to MVV, another adventure abroad, this time in the Netherlands. In Maastricht he scored in his first game for MVV two times. The first goal, in the third minute, was the first goal in the season. In December 2007 was chosen footballer of the year in Eerste divisie, he was nominated as the best player in Netherlands Limburg in 2007. At MVV he scored 42 goals in 2 seasons.

Lierse
On 26 June 2009 it was announced that Thiebaut joined Belgian Second Division club Lierse SK.

Statistics

References

External links
 

1977 births
Living people
People from Asse
Belgian footballers
AC Omonia players
F.C.V. Dender E.H. players
1. FC Saarbrücken players
S.V. Zulte Waregem players
K.F.C. Dessel Sport players
S.C. Eendracht Aalst players
MVV Maastricht players
Belgian Pro League players
Challenger Pro League players
Cypriot First Division players
2. Bundesliga players
Eerste Divisie players
Belgian expatriate footballers
Belgian expatriate sportspeople in Cyprus
Expatriate footballers in Cyprus
Belgian expatriate sportspeople in Germany
Expatriate footballers in Germany
Belgian expatriate sportspeople in the Netherlands
Expatriate footballers in the Netherlands
Association football forwards
Footballers from Flemish Brabant